A donkey is a four-legged animal, closely related to the horse.

Donkey may also refer to:

Arts, entertainment, and media

Fictional characters
 Donkey (Shrek), a character from the Shrek movies
 Donkey Kong (character), a Nintendo video game character

Films
 Donkey (film), a 2009 Croatian film
 Donkeys (film), a 2010 Scottish film starring James Cosmo

Music
Donkey (band), a band formed in Athens, Georgia
 Donkey (album), second album from Brazilian band Cansei De Ser Sexy
 "Donkey" (song), by Jerrod Niemann

Other arts, entertainment, and media
 Donkey, poker jargon meaning "a bad player"
 DONKEY.BAS, a 1981 game created by Bill Gates to show off the capabilities of IBM's new PC
 "The Donkey" (fairy tale), a fairy tale collected by the Brothers Grimm
 Donkey, variant of the 'Old Maid' card game.

Other uses
 Delph Donkey, nickname given to a train service between Oldham and Delph
 Donkey jacket, a short, buttoned outer coat
 Nodding donkey, a pumpjack
 Steam donkey, a type of steam engine

See also
Donki
eDonkey (disambiguation)
A nickname for Draymond Green